The St. Anthony of Padua Church or simply Church of St. Anthony, is a religious building of the Catholic church located on Yefet Street in Jaffa, the southwestern district of the city of Tel Aviv in central Israel.

The temple stands out for its Gothic Revival style and its clock tower. It was named in honor of St. Anthony of Padua a priest of the Franciscan Order, Portuguese preacher and theologian, venerated as a saint and Doctor of the Church by Catholicism.

The structure was completed in 1932. The church is mainly used by foreign workers, mostly from the Philippines. On the north side of the church is the Terra Sancta high school.

Religious services are offered in Arabic and English.

See also
Catholic Church in Israel
St. Anthony's Church (disambiguation)

References

Arab Israeli culture in Tel Aviv
Asian diaspora in Israel
TelAvivYafo AnthonyChurch
AnthonyChurch
Filipino diaspora in Asia
TelAvivYafo AnthonyChurch
20th-century Roman Catholic church buildings in Israel